Weddingstedt is a municipality in the district of Dithmarschen, in Schleswig-Holstein, Germany. It is situated approximately 5 km north of Heide.

Weddingstedt is part of the Amt Kirchspielslandgemeinde ("collective municipality") Heider Umland.

References

Dithmarschen